Lithoxus planquettei is a species of armored catfish endemic to French Guiana where it is found in stony rivulets of the Atlantic coastal drainages between the Maroni and the Kaw River basin.  This species grows to a length of  SL.

References 

 

Ancistrini
Fish of South America
Fish of French Guiana
Endemic fauna of French Guiana
Fish described in 1982